This is a list of settlements in the Pella regional unit, Greece.

 Achladochori
 Agios Athanasios
 Agios Georgios
 Agios Loukas
 Agras
 Agrosykia
 Akrolimni
 Aloros
 Ampeleies
 Anydro
 Apsalos
 Aravissos
 Archangelos
 Aridaia
 Arnissa
 Arseni
 Aspro
 Athyra
 Axos
 Chrysi
 Dafni
 Dorothea
 Drosero
 Dytiko
 Edessa
 Esovalta
 Exaplatanos
 Filoteia
 Flamouria
 Foustani
 Galatades
 Garefeio
 Giannitsa
 Grammatiko
 Ida
 Kali
 Kallipoli
 Kalyvia
 Karydia
 Karyotissa
 Konstantia
 Kranea
 Krya Vrysi
 Lakka
 Liparo
 Lipochori
 Loutraki
 Lykostomo
 Mandalo
 Mavrovouni
 Megaplatanos
 Melissi
 Mesimeri
 Milea
 Mylotopos
 Nea Pella
 Nea Zoi
 Neromyloi
 Nisi
 Notia
 Orma
 Palaifyto
 Palaios Mylotopos
 Panagitsa
 Pella
 Peraia
 Perikleia
 Petraia
 Piperies
 Plagiari
 Platani
 Polykarpi
 Profitis Ilias
 Promachoi
 Rachona
 Rizari
 Rizo
 Sarakinoi
 Sevastiana
 Skydra
 Sosandra
 Sotira
 Theodorakeio
 Thiriopetra
 Trifylli
 Tsakoi
 Voreino
 Vryta
 Xifiani

By municipality

See also
Slavic toponyms of places in Pella Prefecture
List of towns and villages in Greece

External links 
Map of Central Macedonia. - East Pella
Map of West Macedonia. - West Pella

 
Pella